Avicularia hirschii is a species of spider in the family Theraphosidae, found in Ecuador, Peru and Brazil.

References

Theraphosidae
Spiders described in 2006
Spiders of South America